Pacific is the second studio album by Japanese musical group NEWS, released on November 7, 2007. The album reached the number one position on the Oricon Daily Album Chart and Oricon Weekly Album Chart. Four singles have been released from this album. The limited edition includes a 74-page photobook, while the regular edition comes with an 18-page booklet and 2 bonus tracks. It was released simultaneously with the single "Weeeek."

Tie-ups and theme songs
"Teppen" was used as the theme song to Fuji TV's coverage of the Women's Volleyball World Grand Prix 2005.

Track listing

Charts and certifications

Charts

Sales and certifications

References

2007 albums
News (band) albums